Earth to America was a 2-hour television special that aired on TBS on November 20, 2005. Hosted by Tom Hanks, the star-studded show used a comic approach to raise awareness about global warming, and other environmental issues. It was taped at Caesars Palace in Las Vegas.

Performers 
Tom Hanks
Jack Black
Cedric the Entertainer
Rob Corddry
Larry David
Will Ferrell
Julia Louis-Dreyfus
Bill Maher
Steve Martin
Kevin Nealon (Subliminal Man)
Ray Romano
Martin Short
Ben Stiller
Wanda Sykes
Robin Williams
The cast of Avenue Q
Robert F. Kennedy Jr.
Triumph the Insult Comic Dog
Blue Man Group
SpongeBob SquarePants

References

External links

TBS (American TV channel) original programming
American documentary television films